The Ketchum Hand Grenade was a type of grenade used in the American Civil War. It was patented on August 20, 1861 (U.S. Pat. #33,089) by William F. Ketchum, a mayor of Buffalo, New York, and was partially adopted in the Union Army. They were used in battles such as Vicksburg and Petersburg (both major sieges in the war).

Overview

The grenades have the appearance of a cast-iron ball, or a skinny dart, having fins of cardboard to stabilize the flight. They assured landing on the nose, which was backed by a percussion cap that set off  the main powder charge in the body.  The grenades were largely inefficient because they had to land on their nose to detonate. In one incident Confederates caught them in blankets and hurled them back at the attackers.

Ketchums came primarily in 1, 3 and 5 lb. varieties. The most recognized Confederate copy is the Raines Grenade; it was even less effective. In most cases, the body was the same, but a long cloth streamer was substituted for the fins, and the plunger was a contact explosive.

The shape of the Ketchum grenade is recognizable as the shape of the "vortex football," a foam ball produced and marketed by Nerf a century after the Ketchum grenade was used in war.

Construction
The grenade was a three-piece weapon, consisting of the plunger (or nostril), casing (body or orange shell, containing main charge), and tailpiece. The slightly convex metal plunger was removed to set the percussion cap on the nipple within the casing. The plunger was refitted through means of depressing by the striking of something hard and solid to drive it back. This proved to be difficult, especially in the fray of battle.

The wood tailpiece was removed to place the powder charge inside the shell, and then set firmly back in to hold the powder within. Trajectory had to be an arc in order for the plunger to detonate the piece. A small pressure spring attached to the side of the plunger stem held the plunger in place during flight. The grenade was stabilized by four thin paper fins set into a wood tailpiece protruding from the rear of the projectile.

In action
One of the most famous accounts of Ketchum grenades use occurred during the Union assault near the Confederate works referred to as the "Priest Cap" in Port Hudson, Louisiana. The New York troops threw Ketchum grenades over the entrenchments into the works of the Confederates. The defending Confederates figured out that if the plunger didn't strike at the correct angle the grenade would fall harmlessly onto the ground. Lt. Howard C. Wright described the scene from the Confederate side of the assault:

"The enemy had come this time prepared with hand grenades to throw into our works from the outside. When these novel missiles commenced falling among the Arkansas troops they did not know what to make of them, and the first few which they caught not having burst, they threw them back upon the enemy in the ditch. This time many of them exploded and their character was at once revealed to our men. Always equal to any emergency, they quickly devised a scheme…Spreading blankets behind the parapet, the grenades fell harmlessly into them, whereupon our boys would pick them up and hurling them with much greater force down the moat they would almost invariably explode."

Another detailed account of using Ketchums was Bank's July 14 assault at Port Hudson was written by a correspondent of the New York Herald on June 17, 1863, and is quoted in the following text.

"The Last Assault on Port Hudson

The Illustrated London News, vol. 43, no. 1212, p. 27.

July 11, 1863

THE LAST ASSAULT ON PORT HUDSON

…The point of attack was the extreme north-easterly angle of the enemy's breastworks, and the plan of the assault was briefly as follows:--The 75th New York, under command of Captain Cray, and the 12th Connecticut, led by Lieutenant-Colonel Peck, were detailed as skirmishers, forming a separate command under Lieutenant-Colonel Babcock, of the 74th New York. The 91st New York, Colonel Van Zandt commanding--each soldier carrying a five-pound hand-grenade, with his musket thrown over his shoulder--followed next in order. The skirmishers were to creep up and lie on the exterior slope of the enemy's breastworks, while the regiment carrying the grenades were to come up to the same position and throw over their grenades into the enemy's lines, with a view to rout them and drive them from behind their works."

"The 24th Connecticut, Colonel Mansfield, with their arms in like manner to the grenade regiment, followed, carrying sandbags filled with cotton, which were to be used to fill up the ditch in front of the enemy's breastworks, to enable the assaulting party the more easily to scale them and charge upon the rebels…. In consequence of the repulse of the portion of the 75th that succeeded in reaching the ditch the hand-grenades could accomplish but little. In fact, although they made many desperate but gallant attempts to be of service, they rather damaged than benefited our chances of success, for, as they threw their grenades over the rebel breastworks, the rebels actually caught them and hurled them back upon us. In the meantime, while the skirmishers were nobly endeavouring to sustain themselves in their position, Weitzel's column moved up as rapidly as possible, and made a series of desperate assaults on the enemy's works, for which, for bravery and daring, the history of war can hardly furnish a parallel…"

According to Tom Dickey the first time he went to this site on the Port Hudson battlefield, using a metal detector, he recovered thirty-seven Ketchum grenades. Tom later wrote that approximately one-hundred 3 and 5-pound Ketchums were recovered at this location.

The above text is from a published article in the North South Trader's Civil War magazine, Vol. 35, No. 4, Ketchum's Hand Grenade by Jack W. Melton, Jr.

The Port Hudson State Historic Site has in its collection a recovered fragment from a 1-pounder Ketchum hand grenade.

References

External links
 http://armscollectors.com/mgs/grenades!.htm
 http://members.lycos.nl/lexpev/hobbies.html
 http://www.inert-ord.net/19cent/grenat/index.html
 http://www.pooral.com/grenadepages/ketchum.html
 https://patents.google.com/patent/US33089A/

American Civil War weapons
Incendiary weapons
Hand grenades of the United States